Monash College is a college located in Docklands, Australia which specializes in transition education. Monash College is owned by Monash University, one of Australia's largest international universities. The school provides a range of programs and services that align with the various diploma programs of a university.

Monash College specializes in academic programs designed to support a transition to University study (especially Australian universities), with a focus on industry, government, and business. English tuition is also provided to non-native speakers.

The college also provides work experience programs and professional placement initiatives. Similar to the IB Program, Monash College and partners offering the college's program must follow the Unified syllabus, grading guidelines, and testing materials. Some colleges offer a direct pathway to Monash University provided the student reaches a certain pass score.

Notes and references

2. https://www.monashcollege.edu.au/live-and-study-in-australia/campuses/melbourne-city. Retrieved 24 February 2016

Education in Melbourne
Buildings and structures in the City of Melbourne (LGA)
Monash University
Educational institutions established in 1994
1994 establishments in Australia